Gonarezhou is a 2019 Zimbabwean anti-poaching awareness film written and directed by Sydney Taivavashe. The film is produced in conjunction with the Zimbabwe Parks and Wildlife Management Authority.

Premise 
The film is about a young man called Zulu who suffers various misfortunes and joins a poaching gang.

Cast 
 Tariro Mnangagwa as Sergeant Onai.
 Tamy Moyo as Sara.
 Tendaiishe Chitima as Thulo
 Tinashe Nhukarume as Schoolboy
 Eddie Sandifolo as Zulu

Release 
The film was released in 2019. Gonarezhou was shown at the 2020 Pan African Film Festival.

Production 
In 2017, Sydney announced that he was working on a feature film about poaching and that he started developing the script since 2013. The story was inspired by the killings of 300 elephants by poachers using cyanide in 2013.  Principal Photography started in November of 2018.

References

External Links 
 
 

2019 films
Zimbabwean drama films